Queen's York Rangers (1st American Regiment)
Former infantry regiments of Canada


Ranger regiments of Canada
Military units and formations of Ontario

The Queen's Rangers (1st American Regiment) was an infantry regiment of the Non-Permanent Active Militia of the Canadian Militia (now the Canadian Army). First organized in 1921 as The West Toronto Regiment, the regiment was Reorganized in 1925 as The Queen's Rangers and again in 1927 as The Queen's Rangers (1st American Regiment) inheriting the title, insignia and heritage of the famed unit from the Revolutionary War and early days of Upper Canada. In 1936, the regiment was Amalgamated with The York Rangers to form The Queen’s York Rangers (1st American Regiment).

Lineage

The Queen's Rangers (1st American Regiment) 
 Originated on 15 January, 1921, in Toronto, Ontario, as The West Toronto Regiment.
 Amalgamated on 1 August, 1925, with the 2nd Battalion (35th Battalion, CEF), The York Rangers and Redesignated as The Queen's Rangers.
 Redesignated on 1 December, 1927, as The Queen's Rangers (1st American Regiment).
 Amalgamated on 15 December, 1936, with The York Rangers and Redesignated as The Queen's York Rangers (1st American Regiment) (MG).

Lineage Chart

Perpetuations 

 20th Battalion (Central Ontario), CEF
 35th Battalion, CEF

History

The Great War 
On 7 November, 1914, the 20th Battalion (Central Ontario), CEF was authorized for service and on 15 May 1915, the battalion embarked for Great Britain. On 15 September 1915, the battalion disembarked in France where it fought as part of the 4th Canadian Infantry Brigade, 2nd Canadian Division in France and Flanders until the end of the war. On 30 August 1920, the 20th Battalion, CEF was disbanded.

On 7 November, 1914, the 35th Battalion, CEF was authorized for service. On 9 February 1915, the battalion was redesignated as the 35th Reserve Battalion, CEF and on 16 October, 1915, the battalion embarked for Great Britain. After its arrival in the UK, the battalion provided reinforcements to the Canadian Corps in the field. On 4 January, 1917, the battalion’s personnel were absorbed by the 4th Reserve Battalion, CEF. On 8 December, 1917, the 35th Battalion, CEF was disbanded.

The West Toronto Regiment 
Following the end of the First World War, the Otter Commission was established to determine the how the units of the wartime raised Canadian Expeditionary Force would be perpetuated in the peacetime Canadian Militia. As a result of the Commission, a new regiment was formed in the Toronto area known as The West Toronto Regiment. The new regiment was granted the perpetuation of the famed wartime 20th Battalion (Central Ontario), CEF that had seen service on the Western Front with the 2nd Canadian Division.

The Queen's Rangers (1st American Regiment) 
In 1925, new budget cuts and regulations from the Department of National Defence would establish that no infantry regiment of the militia was to have more than one active battalion. This would directly affect another Toronto-based regiment, The York Rangers which had 2 active battalions. As such, on 1 August 1925, the 2nd Battalion, The York Rangers was Amalgamated with The West Toronto Regiment and the newly formed unit was Redesignated as The Queen’s Rangers, reviving the heritage of the famed unit commanded by John Graved Simcoe during the early days of Upper Canada. This amalgamation also brought with it the additional perpetuation of the wartime 35th Battalion, CEF carried over to the new unit.

On 1 December 1927, King George V formally Redesigned the regiment as The Queen's Rangers (1st American Regiment), and further authorized the regiment to readopt the same badge used by Simcoe’s Rangers back in 1779.

As a result of the 1936 Canadian Militia Reorganization, on 15 December 1936, The Queen's Rangers (1st American Regiment) was Amalgamated with The York Rangers to form The Queen's York Rangers (1st American Regiment) (MG).

Organization

The West Toronto Regiment (15 January, 1921) 

 Regimental Headquarters (Toronto, Ontario)
 1st Battalion (Toronto, Ontario) (perpetuating the 20th Battalion, CEF)
 2nd (Reserve) Battalion

The Queen's Rangers (01 August, 1925) 

 Regimental Headquarters (Toronto, Ontario)
 1st Battalion (Toronto, Ontario) (redesignation of 1st Battalion, The West Toronto Regiment; perpetuating the 20th Battalion, CEF)
 2nd (Reserve) Battalion (redesignation of 2nd Battalion, The York Rangers; perpetuating the 35th Battalion, CEF)

Alliances 

 The Queen's Royal Regiment (West Surrey) (Until 1936)
 2nd Battalion (The City of Newcastle Regiment) (1934-1936)

Battle Honours 

 Mount Sorrel
 Somme, 1916, '18
 Flers-Courcelette
 Thiepval
 Ancre Heights
 Arras, 1917, '18
 Vimy, 1917
 Hill 70
 Ypres, 1917
 Passchendaele
 Amiens
 Scarpe, 1918
 Drocourt-Quéant
 Hindenburg Line
 Canal du Nord
 Cambrai, 1918
 Pursuit to Mons
 France and Flanders, 1915-18

References